Earl Manvers was a title in the Peerage of the United Kingdom. It was created in 1806 for Charles Medows Pierrepont, 1st Viscount Newark. He had already been created Baron Pierrepont, of Holme Pierrepont in the County of Nottingham, and Viscount Newark, of Newark-on-Trent in the County of Nottingham, in 1796. Both these titles were in the Peerage of Great Britain. Born Charles Medows, he was the second son of Philip Medows, Deputy Ranger of Richmond Park, by Lady Frances Pierrepont, daughter of William Pierrepont, Earl of Kingston (1692–1713), eldest son and heir apparent of Evelyn Pierrepont, 1st Duke of Kingston-upon-Hull. The name of the earldom derives from the Manvers family, from a marriage to an heiress of which family (Annora de Manvers) the family seat of Holme Pierrepont (formerly simply Holme) had passed into the Pierrepont family in the 13th century.

In 1788 Charles Medows had succeeded to the Pierrepont estates on the death of the second Duke's wife, and assumed the same year by Royal sign manual the surname of Pierrepont in lieu of Medows. Manvers's eldest son Evelyn Pierrepont predeceased him and he was succeeded by his second son Charles, the second Earl. He was a naval commander and Member of Parliament. He was succeeded by his second and only surviving son, Sydney, the third Earl. He represented Nottinghamshire South in Parliament. He was succeeded by his eldest son, Charles, the fourth Earl. He sat as Conservative Member of Parliament for Newark, elected on four separate occasions. On his death the titles passed to his only son Evelyn, the fifth Earl. He suffered a mental breakdown at the age of 17 and never married.

The fifth Earl was succeeded by his cousin Gervas Pierrepont, the sixth and last Earl. He was the only son of the Hon Evelyn Henry Pierrepont (1856–1926), second son of the third Earl.  The sixth Earl's only son died as a child and the Earldom and subsidiary titles became extinct on the Earl's death in 1955.

Other members of the family may also be mentioned. Edward Medows (died 1813), brother of the first Earl, was a captain in the Royal Navy. Sir William Medows, brother of the first Earl, was a General in the British Army. The Honourable Henry Pierrepont, third son of the first Earl, was a diplomat.

The ancestral seat of the Earls Manvers was Thoresby Hall, near Ollerton, Nottinghamshire. The hall itself, built in the 1860s by the third Earl to the designs of Anthony Salvin was the 3rd building on the site replacing a smaller Georgian house which in turn had replaced a large Baroque house designed by Talman which had burned down. It remained the home of the last Countess Manvers until her death aged 95 in 1984 and was subsequently sold by the family and is now a hotel and conference venue. The Thoresby wider agricultural and forestry estate remains with the descendants of the Pierreponts and they have built a new Country House elsewhere on the Estate.

A comprehensive school named after him – Manvers Pierrepont Comprehensive, Carlton Road, Nottingham. The school site still exists but rationalisation transformed it to a College of Further Education.

Arms

The arms of the head of the Pierrepont family are blazoned Argent semée of cinquefoils gules, a lion rampant sable.

Earls Manvers (1806)
Charles Pierrepont, 1st Earl Manvers (1737–1816)
Evelyn Henry Frederick Pierrepont (1775–1801) 
Charles Herbert Pierrepont, 2nd Earl Manvers (1778–1860)
Charles Evelyn Pierrepont, Viscount Newark (1805–1850)
Sydney William Herbert Pierrepont, 3rd Earl Manvers (1825–1900)
Charles William Sydney Pierrepont, 4th Earl Manvers (1854–1926)
Evelyn Robert Pierrepont, 5th Earl Manvers (25 July 1888 – 6 April 1940). Styled Viscount Newark from 1900 to 1926, he was the eldest son of Charles Pierrepont, 4th Earl Manvers. Educated at Eton, he suffered a mental breakdown at the age of 17 and was incapacitated for the remainder of his life. His estates were administered by a trust. He never married, and his cousin Gervas succeeded to the title on his death.
Gervas Evelyn Pierrepont, 6th Earl Manvers (1881–1955)
Evelyn Louis Butterfield Pierrepont (1924–1928)

References

External links
Papers of the Earls Manvers and their predecessors, held at Manuscripts and Special Collections at The University of Nottingham

Extinct earldoms in the Peerage of the United Kingdom
Noble titles created in 1806
Pierrepont family